Mirza Faizan is an Indian aerospace scientist who developed the Ground Reality Information Processing System (GRIPS).

He then worked for Defence Research and Development Organisation, Satyam Computers, Honeywell, Airbus-France and on aerospace projects in the US.

Faizan is a member of the American Institute of Aeronautics and Astronautics. He currently lives in Texas, US.

References

Scientists from Patna
Indian Institute of Science alumni
Patna University alumni
Living people
Indian computer scientists
Year of birth missing (living people)